Accusing Evidence is a 1916 American silent Western film directed by Allan Dwan and starring Lon Chaney, Pauline Bush and Murdock MacQuarrie.

The film was likely produced by early 1914 but only theatrically released in 1916, due to the actors who appear in the cast with Chaney. For one thing, Pauline Bush wasn't even working for Universal in 1916, and Chaney hadn't worked for director Allan Dwan since 1914. The general opinion is that this film was shot in early 1914 when Chaney made The Honor of the Mounted with Murdock MacQuarrie for Allan Dwan, but the film's release was delayed for some reason for more than two years.

Another theory is that this film could actually be The Honor of the Mounted (or even the 1913 Bloodhounds of the North perhaps) retitled and repackaged. Since the films are all lost, it is impossible to tell, but no reviews or stills exist in any of the 1916 trade journals for this specific title. The bare bones plot synopsis that exists for Accusing Evidence in Universal's records doesn't quite match either of those two earlier films, however.

Plot
Lon, a Northwest Mounted police officer, is in love with a young lady who lives in the woods. He is falsely accused of a breach of duty and, rather than sully the reputation of the Mounted Police corps, he just accepts the charges without protest. He is later vindicated and returned to duty at the end of the film.

Cast
 Murdock MacQuarrie
 Pauline Bush as the young girl of the woods
 Lon Chaney as Lon, a Northwest Mounted police officer

Reception
Film historian Jon Mirsalis opines "The three stars and director Dwan worked on two films that are similar, but not identical: BLOODHOUNDS OF THE NORTH (released in December, 1913) and THE HONOR OF THE MOUNTED (released in February, 1914). It is possible that this was cut together from those two films and released as a "new" picture. Alternatively, this film may have been shot at the same time as those two pictures, but due to some unknown difficulty, was not released for almost three years. With none of the three films surviving, it is a mystery that may never be solved. Chaney biographer Michael F. Blake agrees.

References

External links
 

1916 films
1916 Western (genre) films
1916 short films
American silent short films
American black-and-white films
Films directed by Allan Dwan
Universal Pictures short films
Silent American Western (genre) films
1910s American films
1910s English-language films